Barry Dierks (1899 – February 20, 1960) was an American architect of the Modernist movement. He was active in France, principally on the French Riviera from 1925 to the 1950s

Biography
Son of W. C. Dierks, managing director of C. C. Mellor pianos, Barry Dierks studied architecture at Carnegie Institute of Technology in Pittsburgh, from which he obtained his diploma in 1921. He continued his studies at the École des beaux-arts in Paris in the studio of Léon Jaussely.

The need to guarantee his stay in France led him to accept a job at the Bank Choillet. Here, he made the acquaintance of the bank’s director, Colonel Eric Sawyer, former officer in the British Army, who became his lover and lifelong companion.  In 1925, the two decided to leave and establish themselves in the south of France. This carefully considered decision was based on Dierks' profession and the growing demand for country houses in a region where wealthy clients – many of whom were British – built.

At  Théoule-sur-Mer, in the Alpes-Maritimes, he discovered a  isolated site on a private peninsula on the Pointe de l’Esquillon with an inaccessible cove and a private beach where they built their house, the villa Le Trident. This first effort was noticed by Eric’s friends and became the emblem of Dierks’ savoir-faire.

Between 1925 and 1960, the year of Dierks’ death, more than 100 commissions – designs as well as remodeling and enlargements of existing villas – have been tallied. His client base, made up of aristocrats, artists, and business leaders, seemed to have been built by word of mouth. Dierks and his partner were active participants in the social life of the French Riviera.

In Dierks’ achievements, this rich and cultivated clientele found the answer to their desire for a restrained modernity without excess. The architect built for them elegant and functional buildings, where the views and the light of the Mediterranean were skillfully highlighted.

During the Second World War, Barry Dierks conducted humanitarian operations before leaving the regions, and Eric Sawyer joined the Resistance. In 1946, General Georges Catroux noted his consideration, in this respect, in a eulogistic note in the guestbook of the villa Le Trident.

In 1956, Dierks' leg was amputated following an illness. He died on February 20, 1960, with Eric Sawyer surviving him until 1985.

Achievements

According to a study published in 2004, 102 construction sites led by Dierks have been reported. Among these commission, 66 were for British clients and 25 were for French clients. Nearly one-quarter of the villas built were for aristocrats.

The following table presents a partial list of works by Barry Dierks

Notes and references

See also

See also
Modernism
Villa Le Trident

External links
La clientèle de Barry Dierks (Direction régionale des affaires culturelles-PACA)
Iconographie (L'Officiel de la mode, 1939)
Barry Dierks' Villa Tanah Merah, Cap d'Antibes, South of France

20th-century American architects
Modernist architects
1899 births
1960 deaths
French Riviera
Architects from Pittsburgh
Carnegie Mellon University alumni
American alumni of the École des Beaux-Arts
American expatriates in France
LGBT architects
LGBT people from Pennsylvania